Nikolai Aleksandrovich Shanin (25 May 1919 Pskov – 17 September 2011) was a Russian mathematician who worked on topology and constructive mathematics. He introduced the delta-system lemma and the caliber of a topological space.

Further reading

External links

Nikolai Aleksandrovich Shanin at the Steklov Institute of Mathematics at St. Petersburg

Russian mathematicians
1919 births
2011 deaths
People from Pskov